Macrochelidae is a family of mites in the order Mesostigmata.

Description 
Adult females of Macrochelidae have: an undivided dorsal shield bearing at least 28 pairs of setae, a sternal shield with three pairs of setae, a genital shield with one pair of setae and with a pair of conspicuous accessory sclerites beneath lateral margins, usually a ventrianal shield with 1–5 pairs of setae in addition to circumanal setae, peritreme usually looped around stigma, and movable cheliceral digit usually with a well-developed arthrodial brush at the base. Adult males are similar but with a holoventral shield or separate sternigenital and ventrianal shields.

Reproduction 
Macrochelidae reproduce sexually and some can also reproduce asexually. Species of Geholaspis and Macrocheles can perform thelytoky, the production of female offspring from unfertilised eggs. Species of Glyptholaspis, Holostaspella and Macrocheles can perform arrhenotoky, the production of male offspring from unfertilised eggs.

Ecology 
Mites of this family are predators. The majority of species are coprophilous, meaning they live in animal dung and feed on the prey available there (oligochaete worms, nematodes, arthropod eggs and larvae). Dung offers high prey availability and shelter from the weather, but it is a temporary resource. Melicharids therefore attach to insects (e.g. scarab beetles or flies) to be carried to fresh dung deposits; this is known as phoresis. Adult females tend to be the ones that engage in phoresis, though males and nymphs can do it as well.

Some macrochelids are believed to be facultatively parasitic on their hosts, rather than phoretic. An example is Macrocheles muscaedomesticae on flies.

Other macrochelids occupy habitats such as forest litter, decaying plant debris, beach wrack or the nests of various animals.

Biological control 
Because of their predatory nature, some macrochelids have potential as biological control agents of pest insects, such as flies and thrips. The species Macrocheles robustulus is commercially available for this purpose.

Taxonomy 
Macrochelidae contains the following genera and species:

Aethosoma Krantz, 1962
Aethosoma burchellestes Krantz, 1962
Ancistrocheles Krantz, 1962
Ancistrocheles bregetovae Krantz, 1962
Andhrolaspis Türk, 1948
Andhrolaspis trinitatis Türk, 1948
Bellatocheles van Driel & Loots, 1975
Bellatocheles variatus van Driel & Loots, 1975
Calholaspis Berlese, 1918
Calholaspis superbus Berlese, 1918
Calholaspis taiwanicus Tseng, 1993
Cophrolaspis Berlese, 1918
Cophrolaspis glabra (Müller, 1859)

Evholocelaeno Berlese, 1918
Evholocelaeno bursiformis (Berlese, 1910)
Geholaspis Berlese, 1918
Geholaspis aeneus Krauss, 1970
Geholaspis alpina (Berlese, 1887)
Geholaspis asper Valle, 1953
Geholaspis berlesei Valle, 1953
Geholaspis bianchii Valle & Mazzoleni, 1967
Geholaspis comelicensis Lombardini, 1962
Geholaspis foroliviensis Lombardini, 1943
Geholaspis hortorum (Berlese, 1904)
Geholaspis ilvana Valle & Mazzoleni, 1967
Geholaspis lagrecai Valle, 1963
Geholaspis longispinosa (Kramer, 1876)
Geholaspis longula (Berlese, 1882)
Geholaspis mandibularis (Berlese, 1904)
Geholaspis pauperior (Berlese, 1918)
Glyptholaspis Filipponi & Pegazzano, 1960
Glyptholaspis americana (Berlese, 1888)
Glyptholaspis asperrima (Berlese, 1905)
Glyptholaspis baichengensis Ma, 1997
Glyptholaspis cariasoi de-Jesus & Rueda, 1990
Glyptholaspis confusa (Foà, 1900)
Glyptholaspis filipponii Roy, 1988
Glyptholaspis fimicola (Sellnick, 1931)
Glyptholaspis indica Roy, 1988
Glyptholaspis orientalis Iavorschi, 1980
Glyptholaspis pontina Filipponi & Pegazzano, 1960
Glyptholaspis thorri van-Driel, Loots & Marais, 1977
Glyptholaspis wuhouyongi Ma, 1997
Gonatothrix G. W. Krantz, 1988
Gonatothrix carinata G. W. Krantz, 1988
Holocelaeno Berlese, 1910
Holocelaeno mitis Berlese, 1910
Holostaspella Berlese, 1903
Holostaspella ateucha Halliday, 1988
Holostaspella bifoliata (Trägårdh, 1952)
Holostaspella caelata Berlese, 1910
Holostaspella congoensis (van Driel & Loots, 1975)
Holostaspella crenulata Krantz, 1967
Holostaspella exornata Filipponi & Pegazzano, 1967
Holostaspella foai Berlese, 1910
Holostaspella halawanyii Ibrahim, 1992
Holostaspella krantzi Roy, 1988
Holostaspella macula Karg, 1979
Holostaspella moderata Berlese, 1920
Holostaspella orientalis Roy, 1988
Holostaspella scatophila Takaku, 1994
Holostaspella sculpta Berlese, 1903
Holostaspella similiornata Roy, 1988
Holostaspella tropicalis Roy, 1991
Holostaspella tuberilinea (Karg, 1994)
Lordocheles Krantz, 1961
Lordocheles desaegeri Krantz, 1961
Macrocheles Latreille, 1829
 See Macrocheles
Neoholaspis Türk, 1948
Neoholaspis coprophilus Türk, 1948
Neopodocinum Oudemans, 1902
Neopodocinum caputmedusae (Berlese, 1908)
Neopodocinum dehongense Li & Chang, 1979
Neopodocinum galfyi Samsinak & Daniel, 1978
Neopodocinum gigantum Gu & Li, 1987
Neopodocinum halimunensis Hartini & Takaku, 2003
Neopodocinum jaspersi Oudemans, 1902
Neopodocinum magna Krantz, 1965
Neopodocinum maius Berlese, 1911
Neopodocinum petrovae Davydova, 1979
Neopodocinum sinicum Li & Gu, 1987
Neopodocinum spinirostris (Berlese, 1910)
Neopodocinum subjaspersi Hartini & Takaku, 2003
Neopodocinum vanderhammeni Krantz, 1965
Neopodocinum wainsteini Arutunian, 1993
Neopodocinum yunnanense Li & Gu, 1987
Nothrholaspis Berlese, 1918
Nothrholaspis tridentatus (G.& R. Canestrini, 1882)
Proholaspina Berlese, 1918
Proholaspina micrarhena (Berlese, 1916)
Synaphasis Krantz, 1961
Synaphasis congoensis Krantz, 1961
Tigonholaspis Vitzthum, 1930
Tigonholaspis saiti Vitzthum, 1930
Tricholaspis Evans, 1956
Tricholaspis marginipilis Evans, 1956
Tricholocelaeno Berlese, 1918
Tricholocelaeno longicoma (Berlese, 1910)
Trigonholaspis Vitzthum, 1930
Trigonholaspis trigonarum (Vitzthum, 1930)
Venatiolaspis van Driel & Loots, 1975
Venatiolaspis pilosus van Driel & Loots, 1975

References

Mesostigmata
Acari families